Joseph P. DeStefano is a member of the New York State Assembly, representing the 3rd district since 2019. The district includes portions of the town of Brookhaven, including Bellport and Mastic Beach in Suffolk County on Long Island. DeStefano is a Republican.

Since 1980, he has served as an active member of the Medford Fire Department, and in 1996, DeStefano was first elected commissioner of the Medford Fire District. Prior to elected office, DeStefano served as a Suffolk County Sheriff’s Office public safety communication supervisor. He is married with two children and one grandchild.

In 2018, Assembly member L. Dean Murray decided to run for the state Senate, where Thomas Croci was retiring.  As a result, DeStefano announced his intentions to run for Murray's Assembly seat.

DeStefano defeated his Democratic opponent, Clyde Parker, 54% to 46%.

References

External links 
 Assembly Member Joe DeStefano (official site)

People from Medford, New York
Politicians from Suffolk County, New York
Republican Party members of the New York State Assembly
21st-century American politicians
Living people
1960 births